Tate Rosner McRae (born July 1, 2003) is a Canadian singer, songwriter, dancer and actress. At the age of thirteen, she gained prominence as the first Canadian finalist on the American reality TV show So You Think You Can Dance. McRae caught the attention of RCA Records in 2019 after her original song "One Day" (2017) went viral on YouTube and TikTok, subsequently releasing her debut EP, All the Things I Never Said (2020). McRae soon gained wider recognition after her song "You Broke Me First" became an international hit. In 2021, McRae was the youngest musician featured on Forbes' 30 Under 30 list. Her second EP, Too Young to Be Sad (2021) was the most streamed female EP of 2021 on Spotify. Her debut studio album, I Used to Think I Could Fly, was released on May 27, 2022. The album was met with positive reviews from critics and reached the top 10 in various countries, and also entered at number thirteen on the US Billboard 200.

Life and career

Early life and education
Tate Rosner McRae was born in Calgary, Alberta on July 1, 2003, to a Canadian father of Scottish descent and a German mother. At age four, due to her father's work, she moved with her family to Oman, where her mother taught dance lessons, and she lived there for three years. During her time in Oman, McRae attended The American International School Muscat (TAISM). McRae began recreational dance training at age six. Having returned to Calgary, at the age of eight, she began to train more intensively in dance and competed with Drewitz Dance Productions. From age 11, she began training in all styles of dance at YYC Dance Project, a dance company owned by her mother, and undergoing ballet training at the School of Alberta Ballet, the training school for the Alberta Ballet Company.

McRae attended Western Canada High School, but graduated online in 2022, due to her "busy schedule".

2013–2018: Dance career and voice acting
McRae served as a voice actress for the Lalaloopsy franchise, voicing the part of Spot Splatter Splash from the show's inception in 2013 until its conclusion in 2015.

McRae began dancing competitively, she was awarded Mini Best Female Dancer at the 2013 Dance Awards in New York City. After gaining some prominence, she became a brand ambassador for the American dance manufacturer Capezio. She became a finalist at the New York City Dance Alliance's 2014 National Gala.

In 2015, McRae was awarded a two-week scholarship at the Berlin State Ballet company after winning the silver medal as a soloist and bronze medal for her duet at the 2015 Youth America Grand Prix. She danced in the music video for Walk off the Earth's platinum-certified single "Rule The World". For the second time, McRae was awarded the Best Female Dancer award at the 2015 Dance Awards, this time in the "Junior" category.

In June 2016, she performed at Justin Bieber's concert in Calgary for the Purpose World Tour during Bieber's performance of "Children". In April 2016, McRae performed on The Ellen DeGeneres Show as part of the DancerPalooza troupe. In June 2016, she then took part in the thirteenth season of American television show So You Think You Can Dance. While competing for the America's Favorite Dancer title as a non-American, she was mentored by American dancer and actress Kathryn McCormick. She advanced further in the competition than any other Canadian in the show's history, placing third on the final episode. Canadian TV host Murtz Jaffer from Toronto Sun reacted, "The fact that Canadians couldn't vote for Tate makes her third-place finish all the more impressive. While she might not have been voted America's favourite dancer, she certainly might be Canada's." She performed at the 2016 Teen Choice Awards as a finalist from the SYTYCD cast. She performed again on The Ellen DeGeneres Show in October 2016 as part of the Jump Dance Convention troupe.

She was featured on the cover of Dance Spirit Magazine in April 2017. In May 2017, she was featured in a pas de deux in Alberta Ballet Company's production, "Our Canada" choreographed by Jean Grand-Maître.  In November 2017, after performing a dance to Demi Lovato's song Tell Me You Love Me she was invited by Lovato to rehearse with their dancers for their performance at the American Music Awards. For the third time, she won Best Female Dancer at the 2018 Dance Awards in Las Vegas, this time in the "Teen" category, making her the first dancer in the competition's history to win in all categories from mini to teen. In April 2018, she choreographed and danced in the music video for the song "Just Say When" by American rock band Nothing More.

2017–2019: Music career beginnings 
Since its creation in 2011, McRae's YouTube channel has featured a fairly consistent stream of primarily dance videos. In 2017 she started "Create With Tate", a video series, focused on showcasing original songs she wrote and recorded in her bedroom. Her upload of the series' first song "One Day" which she wrote at the age of 14, attracted over 39 million views, prompting her to self-release the song as an independent single. The song would eventually be certified gold in Canada, making it the first certification of her career. From 2017 to 2019, McRae continued to upload and release independent singles as part of her "Create With Tate" series. Notable songs include "Dear Ex Best Friend" which has over 40 million YouTube views and "Dear Parents" with over 20 million views. The series led to her being named a YouTube "Artist on the Rise".

Her earlier upload of "One Day" caught the attention of 11 record labels. She eventually signed with RCA Records, in August 2019, because they supported her maintaining a dance career alongside her music. Following her signing, McRae announced her debut EP All the Things I Never Said (stylized in all lowercase) in December 2019. She released the five-track EP on January 24, 2020, and announced her first headlining tour of Europe and North America. Each stop on the tour was sold out. The tour received a four out of five star rating from Roisin O'Connor of The Independent who described McRae as an impressive performer.

The EP's lead single, "Tear Myself Apart", was co-written by Billie Eilish and Finneas O'Connell. The EP's final single, "Stupid" charted in Ireland and Canada, earning significant radio airplay performance in the latter, peaking within the top 15 of the Canadian pop radio charts. "Stupid" was certified gold in Canada. "That Way", a track from the EP experienced a resurgence in 2021 after going viral on TikTok, and charted in the UK and Ireland. McRae released a remix of "That Way" with Jeremy Zucker on September 3, 2021. By September 2022, the EP had amassed over 500 million streams on Spotify.

2020–2021: Too Young to Be Sad 
In April 2020, McRae released the single "You Broke Me First" as the lead single for her second EP titled Too Young to Be Sad. The song was an international success, peaking within the top ten of the charts in several countries and becoming her first single to chart on the Billboard Hot 100. It was also the longest charting song released by a female artist in 2020 on the Billboard Hot 100, at 38 weeks. and peaked at no 1 on the Mediabase top 40 chart, breaking the record for the longest climb to no 1 by a female solo artist at 28 weeks.

McRae released the single "Vicious" featuring American rapper Lil Mosey in June 2020 and "Don't Be Sad" in August 2020. She was nominated for the MTV Video Music Award for Push Best New Artist, and performed "You Broke Me First" at the VMAs pre-show. In September 2020, she was featured on the cover of Dork Magazine.

McRae made her first late night TV appearance on Jimmy Kimmel Live! in October 21 performing "You Broke Me First". The same month, she released the single "Lie to Me" with Canadian singer Ali Gatie. She again performed "You Broke Me First" in November 2020 at the 2020 MTV Europe Music Awards. She appeared on the cover of Notion in November 2020. In December 2020, she released the second single from her upcoming EP, "R U OK".

McRae gained notable recognition as a rising artist in 2020, being named YouTube's Artist on the Rise, MTV's Push Artist for the month of July, and a Vevo DSCVR artist.
She was featured in Billboard's 21 Under 21 One to Watch list  and named by Pandora, The Independent, NME, Amazon Music, and Uproxx as an artist to watch in 2021. In December 2020, she was the youngest person listed in the Forbes 30 Under 30 list in the music category. In the same month, she was named one of Rolling Stones top ten biggest breakthrough artists of 2020, and featured on TikTok's "The Come Up: Emerging Artists" list as one of the top emerging artists on the platform. She was also featured on Harper's Bazaar's "On the Rise" series. Towards the end of the year, following the success of "You Broke Me First", she signed a worldwide publishing deal with Sony/ATV.

In January 2021, McRae performed "You Broke Me First" on The Tonight Show Starring Jimmy Fallon. The following day, she released the song "Rubberband" as the third single from her upcoming EP. 
On March 3, 2021, she released the single "Slower" and announced her second EP called Too Young to Be Sad, which was released on March 26, 2021. On that same day, she was announced as an Apple Music Up Next artist. In March 2021, McRae appeared on Jimmy Kimmel Live! performing "Slower", and received two Juno Award nominations.

On April 16, 2021, McRae released the track You alongside Regard and Troye Sivan. On May 8, 2021, McRae performed a global virtual show, "Too Young to Be Sad". The show was praised by Ali Shutler of NME, who gave it a four star rating out of five, and described the show as slick, impressive, constant spectacle with pop star ambition. Later that month, she signed her first endorsement deal with Essentia water. In May 2021, McRae was nominated for the Social Star Award at the IHeartRadio Music Awards, and performed "You" alongside Regard and Troye Sivan on The Tonight Show Starring Jimmy Fallon. At the end of the month, she was featured on the sound track of the Amazon original series Panic with the track "Darkest Hour".

In June 2021, she was featured on the song "U love U" by Blackbear, she performed "Lie to Me" at the 2021 Juno Awards alongside Ali Gatie, and released the track "Working", a collaboration with Khalid. In August 2021, McRae was featured on the cover of Hunger. In October 2021, she was featured on Billboard's 21 under 21 list for 2021 and People's One to Watch list for 2021. McRae was featured on the cover of Numéro in November 2021. By the end of 2021, Too Young to Be Sad had amassed over 1 billion Spotify streams, becoming the most streamed EP of 2021 by a female artist on Spotify. The EP was nominated for Album of the Year and Pop Album of the Year at the 2022 Juno Awards.

2021–present: I Used to Think I Could Fly 

On November 11, 2021, McRae released "Feel Like Shit", the lead single from her debut studio album I Used to Think I Could Fly, which was released on May 27, 2022. In January 2022, she was nominated for three iHeart Radio Awards.

"She's All I Wanna Be", the second single from the album, was released on February 4, 2022. The song charted in the top 40 in several countries, and debuted at no 52 in the US, becoming her highest debut to date on the hot 100. In February 2022, McRae was announced as a brand ambassador for Maybelline and the face of their new Vinyl Ink liquid lipcolor.

McRae released "Chaotic", the third single from the album on March 25, 2022, and released "What Would You Do?" as the fourth single on May 13, 2022. On June 3, 2022, Tate released a music video for her single "don't come back" exclusively via TikTok, and later released the vertical version of the video on July 11, 2022 on YouTube.

In September 2022, McRae released the single "uh oh". In November 2022, Tate was featured on DJ Tiësto's "10:35", a promo-single for the opening of the luxury Hotel Atlantis, The Royal in Dubai. She was nominated for 5 Juno Awards in 2023, and announced as a performer for the show.

Influences 
McRae has named Post Malone, The Weeknd, Khalid, Jessie Reyez and Jeremy Zucker as her biggest musical influences. She cites Zendaya and Dua Lipa as all around influences, and has described both women as her biggest idols, noting that she looks up to them in all aspects of life. She has also named Bruno Mars, Britney Spears, Ciara, Jennifer Lopez and Justin Timberlake as inspirations for bringing dance into her performances, while naming Taylor Swift, Julia Michaels and Alec Benjamin as songwriting inspirations. Further, McRae has called herself a "huge fan" of Swift and described her as "one of the greatest songwriters." McRae has also expressed an admiration for Billie Eilish.

Reception 
McRae has been described as "the teen dance star turned future pop idol" by i-D, "the new teen queen" by Notion, "Canada's answer to Billie Eilish" by Elle, and "one of pop's bright young hopes" by The Independent. 
She has also been noted for her honest lyrics, impressive vocals and relatable music. Additionally, McRae has received considerable acclaim as a dancer, and has been praised by artist, dancer and choreographer Paula Abdul who declared her a "gift from God", and choreographers such as Stacey Tookey and  Blake McGrath both of whom stating that she's talented beyond her years, with the latter describing her as "one of the best dancers he has ever worked with" as well as two-time Emmy winner Travis Wall who has named her as one of his muses. Margret Furher of Dance Spirit Magazine described her dancing as virtuosic both technically and artistically. Currently, her YouTube channel had over 880 million views, and she has gained more than 4 billion career streams.

Discography

Studio albums

Extended plays

Singles

As lead artist

As featured artist

Other charted songs

Filmography

Film

Television

Awards and nominations

Listicles

Tours

Headlining
 All the Things I Never Said Tour (2020)
 Tate McRae Live Tour (2022)

Co-headlining
 The iHeartRadio Jingle Ball Tour (2021)
 The iHeartRadio Jingle Ball Tour (2022)

Opening act
 Shawn Mendes' Wonder: The World Tour (2022) - Cancelled

See also 
 List of So You Think You Can Dance finalists

Notes

References

External links 

2003 births
Living people
21st-century Canadian actresses
21st-century Canadian dancers
21st-century Canadian women singers
Actresses from Calgary
Canadian women pop singers
Canadian child actresses
Canadian child singers
Canadian contemporary dancers
Canadian expatriates in Oman
Canadian female dancers
Canadian people of Scottish descent
Canadian people of German descent
Canadian voice actresses
Canadian YouTubers
Child pop musicians
Music YouTubers
Musicians from Calgary
People educated at Western Canada High School
RCA Records artists
So You Think You Can Dance (American TV series) contestants
American alternative rock musicians